Li Lingwei (born January 26, 1989, in Binzhou) is a Chinese track and field athlete who specialises in the javelin throw.

In 2017 she set a new personal best of 66.25 m at the 2017 World Championship in London.  It was more than a metre further than her previous personal best.

In 2017 she represented her country in India at the 2017 Asian Athletics Championships – Women's javelin throw. She took the gold medal with a throw over 63 m beating Dilhani Lekamge of Sri Lanka who had a throw of over 57 metres. She beat her former training partner Nadeeka Lakmali.  Li's throw of 63.06 m was a new championship record.

She has held the Asian area women's javelin record.  She also set a then meet record of 60.65 m, at the 2013 Asian Athletics Championship in Pune. She won the 12th Chinese National Games in 2013 with a throw of 63.06 m, a season's best.  She won the 2014 Chinese National Championships with a throw of 62.56 m, again a season's best.

Competition record

References

External links

1989 births
Living people
Athletes from Shandong
Chinese female javelin throwers
Athletes (track and field) at the 2012 Summer Olympics
Athletes (track and field) at the 2016 Summer Olympics
Olympic athletes of China
Athletes (track and field) at the 2010 Asian Games
Athletes (track and field) at the 2014 Asian Games
Asian Games medalists in athletics (track and field)
World Athletics Championships athletes for China
World Athletics Championships medalists
People from Binzhou
Asian Games silver medalists for China
Asian Games bronze medalists for China
Medalists at the 2010 Asian Games
Medalists at the 2014 Asian Games
21st-century Chinese women